George Wiltshire (also known as George Wilshire, born October 21, 1901 - died December 4, 1976) was an American character actor He appeared on stage, film, and television. He was perhaps best known for portraying Ed Smalls, the proprietor of famed Harlem nightclub Smalls Paradise, the 1945 film It Happened in Harlem.

Filmography
Keep Punching (1939) as Jack Hemingway
It Happened in Harlem (1945) as Ed Smalls
Caldonia (1945) as George, a creditor
Midnight Menace (1946)
Fight That Ghost (1946) as Lawyer Smith
Hi De Ho (1947) as Boss Mason
Killer Diller (1948) as Mortimer Dumdone
Junction 88 (1948) as Rev. Juniper
A French Peep Show (1950)
Sweet Love, Bitter (1967) as George Wilshire

TV series
N.Y.P.D. (1968) as Mr Daggett (in "Which side are you on?")
Grady (mini series, 1975) as Elroy Pitt (in "Be it ever so humble")
Sanford and Son (two episodes in 1976) as Elroy Pitt

References

External links
 

20th-century American male actors
1976 deaths
1901 births